Albert Arthur GM was a Flying Officer with the Royal Air Force Volunteer Reserve during World War II. In 1944, he was awarded the George Medal (GM). The citation read:

Spencer was awarded the GM at the same time.

References 

Royal Air Force Volunteer Reserve personnel of World War II
Recipients of the George Medal